FC Santa Coloma is an Andorran professional football club based in Santa Coloma, parish of Andorra la Vella, that competes in the Primera Divisió. It is the most successful team in both Primera Divisió and Copa Constitució, having won both titles thirteen and ten times respectively.

History

Fútbol Club Santa Coloma was founded in 1986 through the efforts of a group of football enthusiasts who represented the village of the same name that belongs to Andorra la Vella in the National Football Tournament (the former amateur league of Andorra). Later on FC Santa Coloma became one of the founder members of Primera Divisió in 1995. Since 2001 the club has enjoyed a great success in all Andorran competitions standing with all the records in the Premier Andorran League (13) and Andorran Cup (10).

At the end of 2017, the Spanish LaLiga Villarreal CF team announced a collaboration agreement with the Andorran club at grassroots football level.

In July 2022, Gold Star Sports Management Group, lead by Ukrainian-American Entrepreneur, Daniel Milstein, completed the acquisition of the club. With Milstein announced as the Chairman, he announced Alex Lubyansky as CEO and Annabel Llevot as the General Manager.  FC Santa Coloma and Gold Star FC Detroit are both under the Gold Star Football Club group of clubs.

FC Santa Coloma in Europe
FC Santa Coloma has two unique achievements for an Andorran team in European competitions, never repeated so far by any Andorran team: it is the only team from Andorra to win a match in any European competition and the only team that did not concede a goal in a match in a European competition.

Both of these feats were achieved on three occasions: the first match in the 2007–08 UEFA Cup qualifying round against the Israeli side Maccabi Tel Aviv, in which FC Santa Coloma won 1–0 at home with a goal scored by Juli Fernandez, then in the 2014–15 UEFA Champions League First qualifying round when they beat Banants of Armenia 1–0, and in the 2018–19 UEFA Europa League Second qualifying, in which FC Santa Coloma won 1–0 at home against Valur of Iceland. On the first and last occasion, in the return leg they lost 4–0 to Maccabi and 3–0 to Valur, thus FC Santa Coloma were eliminated from the tournament.

Against Banants, they lost the second leg away in Armenia 3–2, however the game finished 3–3 on aggregate and FC Santa Coloma won by the away goals rule, thanks to a last minute goal by goalkeeper Eloy Casals. It was the second time an Andorran club won a two-legged tie in Europe after Sant Julià.

Colours and badge
FC Santa Coloma dressed in all white all the seasons since the creation of the Andorran Premier League, alternating the home kit with red or blue. Traditionally the away kit has been all blue and third kit all red. However the original first kit at the beginning of the foundation of the club was blue and gives the nickname of Blues. In the club crest feature the colours of Andorra and the Holy Dove that gives the name of the Santa Coloma d'Andorra town and therefore the name of the club.

* Since the Andorra Football Federation affiliation.

Club rivalries

El Clàssic
The main rival of FC Santa Coloma in Primera Divisió has been always Sant Julià playing in a derby called El Clàssic. Both teams are strong in the Andorran Premier League and since the creation of the championship the clubs have been competing for being the champion of the top flight.

El Derbi Colomenc
The local rival of FC Santa Coloma is actually their neighbour's hometown football team UE Santa Coloma. The rivalry between these two teams has increased since the 2009/10 season when those teams were competing for winning the Premier Andorran League.

Honours
Primera Divisió: 
Winners (13): 1994–95, 2000–01, 2002–03, 2003–04, 2007–08, 2009–10, 2010–11, 2013–14, 2014–15, 2015–16, 2016–17, 2017–18, 2018–19
Runners-up (8): 1997–98, 1998–99, 1999–00, 2006–07, 2008–09, 2011–12, 2012–13, 2019–20
Copa Constitució: 
Winners (10): 1991, 2001, 2003, 2004, 2005, 2006, 2007, 2009, 2012, 2018
Runners-up (6): 1996, 1998, 1999, 2015, 2017, 2019
Supercopa Andorrana:
Winners (7): 2003, 2005, 2007, 2008, 2015, 2017, 2019
Runners-up (10): 2004, 2006, 2009, 2010, 2011, 2012, 2014, 2016, 2018, 2020

League history

European results 
In 2014, Santa Coloma advanced for the first time in a knock-out round after beating FC Banants on the away goals rule. The deciding goal was scored by Coloma's goalkeeper in the 4th minute of added time.

Notes
 PR: Preliminary round
 QR: Qualifying round
 1Q: First qualifying round
 2Q: Second qualifying round

Current squad
As of 25 January 2023

Managers

 Santos Ilatigo (2006–07)
 Xavier Roura (2007)
 Vicens Marques (2008–10)
 Xavier Roura (2010–11)
 Luis Blanco Torrado (2011–13)
 Richard Imbernón (2013–18)
 Marc Rodríguez (2018–20)
 Albert Jorquera (2020–)

References

External links
FC Santa Coloma Official Web
Santa Coloma at UEFA.COM
Santa Coloma at Weltfussball.de
Santa Coloma at National Football Teams.com
Santa Coloma at Football-Lineups.com

 
Football clubs in Andorra
Association football clubs established in 1986
Sport in Andorra la Vella
1986 establishments in Andorra